The Bréguet 482 was a French four-engined heavy bomber aircraft designed just prior to the outbreak of the Second World War with two prototypes nearing completion when Germany invaded France in 1940, one of which was flown after the end of the war as an experimental platform.

Development and design
In December 1936 the French Air Ministry issued a specification for a four-seat, twin-engined bomber, with Bréguet's initial design, the Bréguet 480 (or Bre. 480) to be powered with the specified  Gnome et Rhône 14L radial engines, intended to carry  of bombs over a  radius of action. Gnome et Rhône abandoned the 14L however, so, after considering a version powered by two Hispano-Suiza 12Y V12 engines, Bréguet reworked the design as the Bréguet 482, with four  Hispano-Suiza 12Z engines,  with an order for two prototypes placed by the French Air Ministry on 12 May 1938.

The Bréguet 482 was a mid-winged monoplane of all-metal construction, with a clean, low-drag, oval section monocoque fuselage, twin tails and a retractable tailwheel undercarriage. The planned defensive armament was a  Hispano-Suiza HS.404 cannon in a power-operated dorsal position, with a  machine gun in the nose and a further two machine guns in ventral mountings.

Operational history
Construction of the two prototypes was well advanced when Germany invaded France on 10 May 1940, and in late May the nearly complete prototypes were evacuated from Villacoublay near Paris, with the first prototype being sent to Bône in Algeria and the second to the Bréguet factory at Anglet, near Bayonne in the far south-west of France. The first prototype was destroyed in Algeria during a German air raid following the Allied invasion of French North Africa, but the second prototype remained untouched, despite the fact that Anglet was occupied by the Germans from 1940.

After the Germans had been driven out, Bréguet resumed work on the Br 482, and proposed to complete it with more powerful Hispano-Suiza 12Z engines and a heavier armament. The French Armée de l'Air had no requirement for it however, and it was decided to use the aircraft with some of the planned modifications as a research aircraft. It was flown for the first time in November 1947 and was used for various experiments, including testing of the 12Z engines.

Variants
Bre 480
Original design, powered by two Gnome-et-Rhône 14L radial engines. Unbuilt.
Bre 481
Proposed versions with two Hispano-Suiza 12Y engines and reduced wing area.
Bre 481 B4
Planned bomber version of Bre 481. Unbuilt.
Bre 481 Raid
Planned long-range record aircraft with further reduced wing area.
Bre 482 B4
Four-engined bomber powered by Hispano-Suiza 12Z engines.
Bre 482 No 1
First prototype - destroyed 1942.
Br 482 No 2
Second prototype, completed 1947 as three-seat research aircraft.

Specifications (Bréguet Br 482)

See also

References

Citations

Bibliography

Cuny, Jean and Pierre Leyvastre. Les Avions Breguet (1940/1971). Paris: Editions Larivière, 1977. DOCAVIA vol. 6. OCLC 440863702
 Green, William. War Planes of the Second World War: Volume Seven Bombers. London:Macdonald, 1967.

1940s French bomber aircraft
 0482
Four-engined tractor aircraft
Four-engined piston aircraft
Aircraft first flown in 1947